Fiji has a unified national police force, the Fiji Police, whose motto is Salus Populi meaning "Health of the People".

The Fijian Commissioner of Police title had been held by Australian police officer Andrew Hughes since 2003 but after the 2006 takeover of the Government the post has been reserved for a local (Ioane Naivaluru a).
The current Fijian Commissioner of Police is Brigadier Sitiveni Qiliho

The Commissioner is appointed in accordance with the Constitution of Fiji, chapter 7, part 4, section 111. Section 111 establishes the office of Commissioner of Police.  This official is appointed by the Constitutional Offices Commission, following consultation with the appropriate Cabinet Minister.  The Commissioner of Police holds executive and administrative authority over the entire police force, and is answerable only to the Minister in charge.  Parliament may, however, make laws regulating the police force.

Fiji has a single local police force, on Rabi Island.

Ranks

External links
 Official website of the Fiji Police Force

References